Nomia aurata is a species of bee in the genus Nomia, in the family Halictidae.

References
 https://web.archive.org/web/20150212153820/http://www.sljol.info/index.php/CJSBS/article/viewFile/496/534
 https://www.academia.edu/7390502/AN_UPDATED_CHECKLIST_OF_BEES_OF_SRI_LANKA_WITH_NEW_RECORDS
 https://www.scribd.com/doc/117262646/2/The-Taxonomy-and-Conservation-Status-of-the-Bees

aurata
Insects described in 1897